Phil Clark (born April 28, 1945) is a former professional American football defensive back in the National Football League for the Dallas Cowboys, Chicago Bears and New England Patriots. He played college football at Northwestern University. He was drafted with the 76th overall pick in the third round of the 1967 NFL Draft by the Dallas Cowboys.

Early years
Clark attended Taylor High School, before accepting a football scholarship from Northwestern University. He was considered the fastest man on the team and played roving linebacker as a junior. 

In 1966, he was named the starter at safety, intercepting 3 passes while receiving second-team All-American and Al-Big Ten honors. He also played in the East–West Shrine Game, the Hula Bowl and the 1967 Chicago College All-Star Game.

Professional career

Dallas Cowboys
The Dallas Cowboys entered the 1967 NFL Draft without a first and second round draft choice, that were traded as part of the price to resolve the Ralph Neely dispute with the Houston Oilers. With their first choice, Clark was selected in the third round (76th overall).

As a rookie, he started 6 games at free safety in place of an injured Mel Renfro. The next year he was a reserve player behind Mike Johnson and Renfro. 

In 1969, he started in 13 games at right cornerback, before being benched in favor of Otto Brown. On January 27, 1970, he was traded along with Craig Baynham to the Chicago Bears in exchange for a second round draft choice  (#27-Bob Asher).

Chicago Bears
In 1970, the Chicago Bears switched him to strong safety, where he earned the starter position. He was released on September 9, 1971.

New England Patriots
On September 22, 1971, he signed as a free agent with the New England Patriots. He was released on October 7, after playing in just two games.

References

1945 births
Living people
People from Cleves, Ohio
Players of American football from Ohio
American football defensive backs
Northwestern Wildcats football players
Dallas Cowboys players
Chicago Bears players
New England Patriots players